Patrick "Pat" McMahon (born 19 September 1945) is a Scottish former footballer who is best known for the time he spent with Aston Villa and Celtic.

Kilsyth Rangers
McMahon began his football career at local Scottish team Kilsyth Rangers. He moved to London, working for the GPO. In April 1967, Kilsyth Rangers sent him a telegram asking him to play for them in the Scottish Junior Cup final as last minute replacement for an injured player. He performed splendidly, and they won the cup.

Celtic
While with Kilsyth Rangers, he wrote to Celtic, asking for trials. Celtic responded promptly and signed him. He spent only two seasons at Celtic Park, and could only manage three league match outings, resulting in two goals.

Aston Villa
In July 1969, Aston Villa manager Tommy Docherty signed him on a free transfer, pipping Dunfermline for his signature. McMahon was in Aston Villa's 1971 Football League Cup Final team and gained a Third Division Championship medal in 1972.

NASL

He left Villa in March 1976 to join goalkeeper teammate Jimmy Cumbes in the North American Soccer League. In the NASL he played for the Portland Timbers, Colorado Caribous and Atlanta Chiefs. He also played one season of indoor with Atlanta. He returned for a final season with Portland in 1982 but did not appear in any matches.

McMahon still works in USA in the aluminum industry.

References

External links 

McMahon's young Bio
NASL stats
NASL indoor stats

1945 births
Living people
People from Kilsyth
Footballers from North Lanarkshire
Scottish footballers
Association football midfielders
Kilsyth Rangers F.C. players
Celtic F.C. players
Aston Villa F.C. players
Portland Timbers (1975–1982) players
Colorado Caribous players
Atlanta Chiefs players
Scottish Junior Football Association players
Scottish Football League players
English Football League players
North American Soccer League (1968–1984) players
North American Soccer League (1968–1984) indoor players
Scottish expatriate footballers
Scottish expatriate sportspeople in the United States
Expatriate soccer players in the United States
People from Croy